Peter Juric (born 4 May 1958) is an Austrian cross-country skier. He competed in the men's 30 kilometre event at the 1984 Winter Olympics.

References

1958 births
Living people
Austrian male cross-country skiers
Olympic cross-country skiers of Austria
Cross-country skiers at the 1984 Winter Olympics
Sportspeople from Salzburg
20th-century Austrian people